Pakshiraja Films was an Indian Movie production company based in Coimbatore, Tamil Nadu, India.It was owned and operated by Film Director S. M. Sriramulu Naidu.From 1937 to 1945 the company released movies from Central Studios, but later from 1945 the company had its own Movie studio under the name Pakshiraja Studios.

See also
 Central Studios
 Pakshiraja Studios

References
 Baker-turned filmmaker - The Hindu article
 Naidu: Hits & Misses - The Hindu (Randoor Guy)
 Reel-time nostalgia

Film production companies of Tamil Nadu
Companies based in Coimbatore
Film production companies based in Coimbatore
Indian companies established in 1937
Mass media companies established in 1937